1985–86 in Argentine football saw the introduction of "European Style seasons" in the Argentine first division. The league title was won by River Plate. Argentinos Juniors were the winners of the Copa Libertadores 1985.

Primera División

League table

Relegation
Relegation was determined by averaging the number of points obtained over the three previous seasons

Relegation table

Chacarita Juniors were relegated directly
Huracán played in the Octagonal promotion tournament.

Octagonal tournament
Quarter Finals

Semi-finals

Final

Qualification for Copa Libertadores 1986
River Plate qualified as League champions
Argentinos Juniors qualified as Copa Libertadores holders
The remaining qualification place was determined by the Liguella Pre-Libertadores

Liguella Pre-Libertadores
Qualifying round

Quarter-finals

Semi-finals

Final

Boca Juniors qualify for the Copa Libertadores 1986.

Copa Libertadores
Argentine teams in Copa Libertadores 1985
Argentinos Juniors: Champions
Independiente: Semi-finalists
Ferro Carril Oeste: 1st round

References
Argentina 1985 by Pablo Ciullini at rsssf.
Copa Libertadores 1985 by Karel Stokkermans at rsssf.

 
Seasons in Argentine football